The Jerome Biblical Commentary is a series of books of Biblical scholarship, whose first edition was published in 1968. It is arguably the most-used volume of Catholic scriptural commentary in the United States. 

The book's title is a reference to Jerome, known for his translation of the Bible into Latin (the Vulgate), and his extensive Biblical commentaries.

First edition 
The Jerome Biblical Commentary was published in 1968 by Prentice Hall: it was edited by Raymond Edward Brown, Joseph A. Fitzmyer, and Roland E. Murphy. It immediately gained enormous fame, selling more than  200,000 copies; it was also translated into Spanish, Italian, and Portuguese.

Second edition 
The New Jerome Biblical Commentary was published in 1990 by the same editors as a revised and updated edition. In the forward to the new edition, Cardinal Carlo Maria Martini acknowledges it as the work of "the best of English-speaking Catholic exegetes... [that] condenses the results of modern scientific criticism with rigor and clarity. Yet this contemporary approach is achieved without neglecting the long road that Christian tradition has travelled in dedicated, constant, and loving attention to the Word of God.... [The pages of the Bible] are duly situated in their appropriate historical and cultural context." Martini goes on to describe it as "an instrument for rich ecumenical dialogue" that avoids "arid literalism 'that kills'" and a drift "into generalized spiritual applications." It contains, besides detailed commentary on all the books of the Bible, introductory articles on parts of the Bible and on each book as well as topical articles:   
Apocrypha; Dead Sea Scrolls; Other Jewish Literature – Raymond E. Brown , Pheme Perkins, Anthony Saldarini
Text and Versions – Raymond E. Brown , D. W. Johnson , Kevin G. O'Connell 
Modern Old Testament Criticism – Alexa Suelzer ,  John S. Kselman .
Modern New Testament Criticism – John S. Kselman , Ronald D. Witherup 
Hermeneutics – Raymond E. Brown , Sandra M. Schneiders, I.H.M.
Church Pronouncements – Raymond E. Brown , Thomas Aquinas Collins 
Biblical Geography – Raymond E. Brown , Robert North 
Biblical Archaeology – Robert North , Philip J. King
A History of Israel – Addison G. Wright , Roland E. Murphy, O.Carm., Joseph A. Fitzmyer 
 Religious Institutions Of Israel – John J. Castelot, Aelred Cody 
Aspects of Old Testament Thought – John L. McKenzie
Jesus – John P. Meier
Paul – Joseph A. Fitzmyer 
Early Church – Raymond E. Brown , Carolyn Osiek , Pheme Perkins
Aspects of New Testament Thought – Raymond E. Brown , John R. Donahue , Donald Senior , Adela Yarbro Collins
Pauline Theology – Joseph A. Fitzmyer 
Johannine Theology – Francis J. Moloney

Third edition 
The Jerome Biblical Commentary for the Twenty-First Century was published on 27 January 2022 by Bloomsbury Publishing: it is edited by John J. Collins, Gina Hens-Piazza, Barbara Reid  and Donald Senior .

The new volume continues its approach of historical-critical methodology in the light of Catholic tradition, with a broader array of commentators beyond Europe and North America; Pope Francis wrote a foreword for the volume.

Editions

References

1968 non-fiction books
Biblical commentaries
Biblical exegesis
Books about the Bible